Bournemouth Water provides drinking water to approximately 500,000 people from the port town of Poole to Beaulieu in the New Forest and from Bournemouth to Salisbury in Wiltshire, an area of over 1000 square kilometres.

History
Bournemouth Water (established 1863) and West Hampshire Water (established 1893) were two former statutory water companies established by Act of Parliament.

The Bournemouth Company were the alternative supplier of gas until nationalisation of the gas industry in 1949

In 1863 Bournemouth Water was established with waterworks in Bourne Valley and a reservoir in Parkstone.

In 1893 The West Hampshire Water Company was established.

In 1994 Bournemouth and West Hampshire Water was formed as the two companies merge.

In July 2010 Bournemouth and West Hampshire Water was acquired by Sembcorp Utilities. Sembcorp Utilities is a wholly owned subsidiary of Sembcorp Industries, an energy, water and marine group listed on the main board of the Singapore Exchange.

Bournemouth and West Hampshire Water plc's registered name was changed to Sembcorp Bournemouth Water Ltd on 21 January 2011; formerly named Sembcorp Bournemouth Water plc for less than 24 hours on that date as part of an efficient mergers and acquisitions deal.

On 16 April 2015 Pennon Group plc – who already owned South West Water, announced they had purchased Sembcorp Bournemouth Water for £100.3 million

Notes and references
Notes
  
References

External links

Pennon Group Plc
www.sembcorp.com - previous owner

Water companies of England
Companies based in Bournemouth
Companies established in 1863
1863 establishments in England